Alphonso Ainsworth (31 July 1913 – 25 April 1975) was an English professional footballer, who played as an inside forward. Born in Manchester, he played for Manchester United, New Brighton and Congleton Town, as well as a number of clubs in Lancashire during the Second World War.

Career

Pre-war
Ainsworth began his career at Ashton United in the Cheshire County League, but signed for Manchester United as an amateur in 1933. On 13 February 1934, he signed his first professional contract with the club, and made his debut in a home game against Bury on 3 March 1934. However, he only made one more appearance for the club, and joined New Brighton in September 1935, making 150 pre-war appearances and scoring 39 goals for the club.

Wartime
After World War II broke out in 1939, Ainsworth played for a number of clubs in the wartime leagues. His first wartime club was Accrington Stanley, but he also played for Bury, Rochdale, Southport and Oldham Athletic.

Post-war
Ainsworth re-registered with New Brighton after the war, and scored a further nine goals in 28 appearances. In December 1947, however, Ainsworth transferred to Congleton Town, where he would play until his retirement.

External links
Profile at StretfordEnd.co.uk
Profile at MUFCInfo.com

1913 births
1975 deaths
Footballers from Manchester
English footballers
Association football forwards
Manchester United F.C. players
New Brighton A.F.C. players
Congleton Town F.C. players
English Football League players
Accrington Stanley F.C. (1891) wartime guest players
Bury F.C. wartime guest players
Oldham Athletic A.F.C. wartime guest players
Rochdale A.F.C. wartime guest players
Southport F.C. wartime guest players